Mycalesis igilia, the small long-brand bushbrown, is a species of satyrid butterfly found in south India.

References

Mycalesis
Butterflies of Asia
Taxa named by Hans Fruhstorfer
Butterflies described in 1911